is Japanese term for a popular form of hot stone spa. It is said to have originated in Japan.

Body-sized stones, such as granite, are inserted into the floor and heated. Bathers lie clothed on the stones while their bodies gradually heat up.

Like low temperature saunas, ganban'yoku are commonly advertised to have a detoxification effect, improve the circulatory system and are good for the skin. A ganban'yoku room in a spa would typically be visited after the baths and would be in a clothing-on area with mixed genders.

Many spa facilities, including Spa LaQua at Tokyo Dome City have ganban'yoku rooms.

References

External links 
 About ganban-yoku

Bathing in Japan